Masuoka (written:  or ) is a Japanese surname. Notable people with the surname include:

, Japanese engineer
, Japanese rally driver
, Japanese voice actor

See also
Matsuoka

Japanese-language surnames